Mefisto in Onyx is a science fiction novella  by American writer  Harlan Ellison. The introduction and cover art were contributed by Frank Miller. Originally published in OMNI Magazine October 1993, then released as a hardcover in December 1993, Mefisto in Onyx  was later included in Harlan Ellison's 1997 collection Slippage.

Ellison stated in an interview with Salon that he wrote Mefisto in Onyx to be adapted into a film starring Forest Whitaker.

The story won the 1993 Bram Stoker Award, tied with The Night We Buried Road Dog by Jack Cady. It also won first place in the 1994 Locus Poll Award "Best Novella" category.

Plot

A black telepath delves into the mind of a white serial killer on death row.

References

1993 novels
English-language novels
Books by Harlan Ellison
American novellas